Lac de Bourdouze is a lake near Puy de Sancy in the Puy-de-Dôme department, France. At an elevation of 1168 m, its surface area is 0.15 km². The lake was formed as a result of glacial depression.

Bourdouze